"The Colour of My Dreams" is a song recorded by American rapper and Eurodance artist B.G., the Prince of Rap, released in April 1994 as the second single from his second album, The Time Is Now (1994). Becoming his most successful song, it charted within the top 20 in Finland and Germany, peaking at number 17 and 13. On the Eurochart Hot 100, it reached number 72 in July 1994. Outside Europe, the single peaked at number-one on the Canadian RPM Dance/Urban chart and number ten in Israel. The female singer on the song is Paris Red.

Critical reception
Pan-European magazine Music & Media wrote, "Although the overall feeling here is mellow with some ambient influences shining through, B.G.'s latest is still very much a dancefloor killer. Its crystal-clear sound and strong hooks should help it find a place on radio as well."

Music video
The accompanying music video for "The Colour of My Dreams" was directed by Swedish-based director Matt Broadley. It was A-listed on Germany's VIVA in June 1994.

Track listings
 CD maxi-single (Europe, 1994)
 "The Colour of My Dreams" (Dreamedia-Mix) – 3:54
 "The Colour of My Dreams" (Dreamidnight-Mix) – 5:24
 "The Colour of My Dreams" (Dream-In-House-Mix) – 5:45

 CD maxi-single - Remix (Europe, 1994)
 "The Colour of My Dreams" (TN'T Radio Version) – 3:40
 "The Colour of My Dreams" (African Jungle Cut) – 6:24
 "The Colour of My Dreams" (TN'T Party Prince-Mix) – 5:54
 "The Colour of My Dreams" (Blue & Grey & Light) – 6:16

Charts

Weekly charts

Year-end charts

References

1994 singles
1994 songs
B.G., the Prince of Rap songs
Dance Pool singles
English-language German songs
Music videos directed by Matt Broadley
Songs about dreams